Chionides (Greek: Χιονίδης or Χιωνίδης) an Athenian comic poet of the 5th century BC, contemporary of Magnes. The Suda says that Chionides flourished eight years before the Greco-Persian Wars, that is, 487 BC. But Augustus Meineke thinks that Chionides flourished no earlier than 460 BC.  In confirmation of this date he quotes from Athenaeus, who quoted a fragment of Chionides' Πτωχοί (Beggars), which mentions Gnesippus, a poet contemporary with Cratinus. Aristotle also notes that Chionides "lived long after Epicharmus". But Athenaeus also noted that some critics at the time regarded Chionides' Πτωχοί as spurious. Similarly, some scholars (e.g. Heinrich Ritter) strongly argue against the genuineness of Aristotle's observations.

Titles of his comedies:

Ἥρωες (Heroes), The Heroes
Πτωχοί (Ptochoi), Poor People, or Beggars
Πέρσαι (Persai), The Persians, or Ἁσσυριοι (Assyrioi), The Assyrians

Fragments
Theodor Kock. Comicorum Atticorum fragmenta, i. (1880).
Augustus Meineke. Potarum Graecorum comicorum fragmenta, (1855).
Rudolf Kassel, Colin Austin. Poetae comici Graeci Volume 4. (1983)

References
Chionides  Dictionary of Greek and Roman Biography and Mythology
Chionides theatrehistory.com
Chionides Ancient Theatre Database
This article paraphrased from an article in Chionides  Dictionary of Greek and Roman Biography and Mythology.

5th-century BC Athenians
Ancient Greek dramatists and playwrights
5th-century BC writers
Old Comic poets